Chirau Ali Mwakwere (born June 15, 1945, in Kwale, Kenya) is a Kenyan politician and diplomat. He served as the Foreign Minister of Kenya from June 2004 to December 2005, and then became transport minister in December 2005, when serious problems within the National Rainbow Coalition caused a cabinet reshuffle. As a young man he became well-educated and entered government service in 1967, serving as an ambassador to several countries and also in several domestic positions, including education. 
He was a member of the Kenya African National Union until 2002, rising to the rank of deputy leader, but he left to join the new opposition National Rainbow Coalition which won the 2002 elections. He is a Muslim and enjoys playing golf.

Mwakwere remained Minister for Transport in the Cabinet named by President Mwai Kibaki on January 8, 2008, following the controversial December 2007 presidential election, and after Kibaki and his rival, Raila Odinga, reached a power-sharing agreement, Mwakwere remained in his post as Minister for Transport in the grand coalition Cabinet named on April 13, 2008.

As of Friday, February 5, 2010, Mwakwere lost his cabinet and parliamentary seat. This was due to a petition filed by a voter, Ayub Juma Mwakesi, who wanted the election of Mwakwere nullified, citing that the entire election process was marred by irregularities. The ruling that nullified Mwakwere's election in the bungled 2007 election was made by High Court Judge Justice Mohamed Ibrahim.
A subsequent by-election was held on July 12, 2010. Mwakwere retained the seat by beating his closest rival, Hassan Mwanyoha of ODM. He sings during campaign rallies and his favorite mobilizing tune is commonly referred to 'Zipapa Zipapa'. He later joined the UHURUTO team in the 2013 general elections which won the Presidency. 
.

Personal life
Mwakwere is married to Ugandan Rose Batsigira. They live in Nairobi and own a home in Mwakwere's home village of Golini in Ziwani, Kwale District.

References

1945 births
Living people
People from Kwale County
Kenyan Muslims
Kenya African National Union politicians
National Rainbow Coalition politicians
Shirikisho Party of Kenya politicians
Government ministers of Kenya
Members of the National Assembly (Kenya)